The Svratka, formerly Švarcava is a river in the South Moravian Region of the Czech Republic. It rises in the Bohemian-Moravian Highlands, converges with the Svitava in Brno, and flows into the Dyje (Thaya) a near Mikulov. The river is known in the local Moravian dialect as the Švarcava (from the German name of the river Schwarzach).

References 

Rivers of the Vysočina Region
Rivers of the South Moravian Region
Břeclav District
Žďár nad Sázavou District